Los Dúo is the twenty-eighth studio album by Mexican musician Juan Gabriel, released on February 10, 2015. It features artists performing duets with Juan Gabriel. A bonus DVD was included. The album won the award for Album of the Year at the Latin American Music Awards of 2015.

Track listing

DVD

Promotion
Juan Gabriel embarked on the Bienvenidos al Noa Noa Gira 2015 to promote the Los Dúo album. The tour ended March 5, 2016.

Charts

Weekly charts

Year-end charts

Certifications

See also
List of number-one albums of 2015 (Mexico)
List of number-one Billboard Latin Albums from the 2010s

References 

Juan Gabriel albums
2015 albums
Spanish-language albums
Fonovisa Records albums
Vocal duet albums